Hydrothassa glabra is a Europe species of leaf beetle in the family Chrysomelinae

Description
Hydrothassa glabra grows to 3 - 4mm in length and are dark metallic blue and orange-yellow in colour. The elytra is coloured orange-yellow with lateral margins. It may be confused with H. marginella or H. hannoveriana.

Habitat 
H. glabra is a widespread species, It has various host plants, particularly buttercups. Creeping buttercup and meadow buttercup' are especially prevalent as host plants. Adults overwinter in grass tussocks.

Distribution
H. glabra is prevalent in central and northern Europe, with a widespread and scattered distribution in the United Kingdom.

References

External links

List of references for Hydrothassa glabra (Herbst, 1783) at Biodiversity Heritage Library

Beetles of Europe
Beetles described in 1783
Chrysomelinae